This article includes the Bahrain national football team results since its beginnings.

2020s

2010s

2019

2018

2017

2016

2015

2014

2013

2012

2011

2010

2000s

2009

2008

2007

2006

2005

External links 
 Bahrain results; FlashScore
 Live Scores - Bahrain; FIFA.com

Bahrain national football team